The 2017 League of Ireland Premier Division was the 33rd season of the League of Ireland Premier Division. The league began on Friday 24 February 2017 and concluded on 27 October 2017. Fixtures were announced on 9 December 2016.

On 17 October, Cork City won the title after a 0-0 draw at home to Derry City.

Overview
The Premier Division consists of 12 teams. Each team plays each other three times for a total of 33 matches in the season.

Limerick, the 2016 First Division champion and Drogheda United, winners of the promotion/relegation playoffs, were promoted to the league, both bouncing straight back after having been relegated the previous season.

On 22 December 2016, the Football Association of Ireland announced that the league would be restructured into two 10-team divisions from the 2018 season onwards, one of the recommendations made in the 2015 Conroy Report. This meant the cancellation of the promotion/relegation playoff and relegation at the end of the 2017 season of 3 teams, with only the champions of the First Division promoted in return.

Teams

Stadia and locations

Personnel and kits

Note: Flags indicate national team as has been defined under FIFA eligibility rules. Players may hold more than one non-FIFA nationality.

Managerial changes

League table

Results

Matches 1–22
Teams played each other twice (once at home, once away).

Matches 23–33
Teams played each other once.

Top scorers

See also
 2017 League of Ireland First Division
 2017 FAI Cup
 2017 League of Ireland Cup
 2017 St Patrick's Athletic F.C. season

References

External links
 Official website
 Full Results and Fixtures

  
1
League of Ireland Premier Division seasons
1
Ireland
Ireland